The Siamaná Formation (E3s) is a fossiliferous geological formation of the Cocinetas Basin in the northernmost department of La Guajira. The formation consists of conglomerates and limestones. The Siamaná Formation dates to the Paleogene period; Middle to Late Oligocene epoch, corresponding to the Deseadan in the SALMA classification.

Etymology 
The formation was defined by Renz in 1960 and named after the village of Siamaná.

Description

Lithologies 
The Siamaná Formation consists of conglomerates and thick carbonates.

Stratigraphy and depositional environment 
The age has been estimated to be Middle to Late Oligocene, corresponding to the Deseadan in the SALMA classification. The depositional environment has been interpreted as shallow marine.

Petroleum geology 
The Siamaná Formation is a reservoir and seal rock formation in the Guajira Basin.

Fossil content

See also 

 Geology of the Eastern Hills
 Cesar-Ranchería Basin
 Honda Group
 Abanico, Castillo, Chota, Loreto, Soncco, Usme Formations
 Tinguiririca fauna

References

Bibliography

Local geology

Paleontology

Maps 
 
 
 
 

Geologic formations of Colombia
Paleogene Colombia
Oligocene Series of South America
Chattian Stage
Deseadan
Conglomerate formations
Limestone formations
Shallow marine deposits
Reservoir rock formations
Seal rock formations
Fossiliferous stratigraphic units of South America
Paleontology in Colombia
Geography of La Guajira Department